Thomas Welch (1742–1816) was a surveyor and judge in Upper Canada

Thomas Welch may also refer to:

Thomas Bramwell Welch (1825–1903), discoverer of the pasteurization process to prevent the fermentation of grape juice
Thomas Welch (American football) (born 1987), NFL offensive tackle
Thomas Welch (cricketer) (1906–1972), English cricketer
Thomas Anthony Welch (1884–1959), American prelate of the Roman Catholic Church
Thomas Vincent Welch (1850–1903), New York State Assemblyman 
Tom Welch (politician), American politician in Montana
Tom Welch (curler) in WFG Tankard

See also
Thomas Welsh (disambiguation)
Thomas Walsh (disambiguation)